The Guadarranque is a short coastal river of Spain in the Andalusian comarca of Campo de Gibraltar in the province of Cádiz. It is impounded to form the Embalse de Guadarranque. Its name is derived from the Arab Wadi Ramke or "river of mares".

The Guadarranque solar power plant is a photovoltaic solar power plant in the Guadarranque industrial park, named after the river, in San Roque, Cádiz. 

This river should not be confused with the other Guadarranque River in the Montes de Toledo.

References 

Rivers of Spain
Rivers of Andalusia
Geography of the Province of Cádiz